Vasilijus Lendel  (born 9 April 1995) is a Lithuanian male track cyclist, representing Lithuania at international competitions. He competed at the 2014 UEC European Track Championships and 2015 UEC European Track Championships in the sprint and keirin event. He won the silver medal at the 2016–17 UCI Track Cycling World Cup, Round 1 in Glasgow in the keirin.

Career 
In 2020 Lendel was awarded Lithuanian Cycling Federation title for Lithuanian male cyclist of the year. In 2021 Lendel won the title of Lithuanian male cyclist of the year again.

Major results

2016
  Keirin, 2016–17 UCI Track Cycling World Cup, Round 1 in Glasgow
  Individual Sprint, UEC European U23 Track Championships 

2017
  Individual Sprint, 2017–18 UCI Track Cycling World Cup, Round 4 in Santiago
  Individual Sprint, 2017–18 UCI Track Cycling World Cup, Round 5 in Minsk

2020
  Individual Sprint, 2020 Baltic Track Cycling Championships
  Keirin, 2020 Baltic Track Cycling Championships
  Team Sprint, 2020 Baltic Track Cycling Championships
  Individual Sprint, UEC European Track Championships

References

1995 births
Living people
Lithuanian male cyclists
Lithuanian track cyclists
Place of birth missing (living people)
European Games competitors for Lithuania
Cyclists at the 2019 European Games